The Marmara Express was a passenger train operated by the Turkish State Railways between Basmane Terminal in İzmir and Bandırma. At Bandırma, the train offered a connection to İDO ferries to İstanbul, across the Marmara Sea. The Marmara Express was discontinued in 2004 due to the rehabilitation of the Manisa-Bandırma railway. On 21 February 2007, the 6 September Super Express began operating on the same route, however with limited stops.

References

Named passenger trains of Turkey